Ruyifang Station is a station on Line 6 of the Guangzhou Metro. It is located underground in the Liwan District of Guangzhou. It started operation on 28December 2013.

Construction incident 
No injuries were reported, and by 06:30 on 6 October, the previously submerged  portion was re-sealed.

Station layout

Exits

References

Railway stations in China opened in 2013
Guangzhou Metro stations in Liwan District